Karel Dostal (1884–1966) was a Czechoslovak stage and film actor.

Selected filmography
 Grand Hotel Nevada (1935)
 The World Is Ours (1937)
 The Magic House (1939)
 Second Tour (1939)
 The Blue Star Hotel (1941)
 The Hard Life of an Adventurer (1941)
 Fourteen at the Table (1943)
 Saturday (1945)
 Bohemian Rapture (1947)
 Temno (1950)

References

Bibliography
 Jarka Burian. Modern Czech Theatre: Reflector and Conscience of a Nation. University of Iowa Press, 2002.

External links

1884 births
1966 deaths
Czechoslovak male actors
People from Nymburk
Theatre directors from Czechoslovakia
Burials at Olšany Cemetery